The tenth season of Mad TV, an American sketch comedy series, originally aired in the United States on the Fox Network between September 18, 2004, and May 21, 2005.

Summary
With MADtv in its tenth year on FOX, the show continued to change with cast turnover. Mo Collins left while Josh Meyers was fired. The only new cast members this season were Crista Flanagan (who was promoted to repertory player in the next season) and Spencer Kayden (who became one in a long line of microscopically short-lived MADtv players who joined the cast in the middle of the season, barely appeared in sketches, and were immediately fired at its end). Despite the lack of new cast members, the show saw an abundance of featured players getting promoted to repertory status, as seen with the promotions of Daniele Gaither, Keegan-Michael Key, Nicole Parker, and Jordan Peele, all of whom became the show's most memorable cast members since the days of the original 1995-1996 cast.

This season saw many departures by season's end. Aries Spears, who had been a cast member since season three, left the show after eight years, tying Debra Wilson's then-record for longest tenure as a MADtv cast member, which would later be surpassed by Michael McDonald's ten years. Ron Pederson and Paul Vogt would also say goodbye to the show. While Vogt quit so he could work on Broadway, Pederson was fired due to FOX cutting the show's cast budget.

Notable celebrity guest stars this season include: John Heder, Alanis Morissette, Charla Faddoul, Mirna Hindoyan, Bill Maher, Ja Rule, former MADtv cast members Mo Collins, Nicole Sullivan, Debra Wilson, Artie Lange, and Will Sasso; Marilyn Manson, Nelly, Nicole Richie, Amber Tamblyn, Michael Cera, Tony Hale, Christopher Masterson and his brother, Danny; Flava Flav, and Jeff Probst.

Opening montage 
The title sequence begins with the Mad TV logo appearing above the Los Angeles skyline. The theme song, which is performed by the hip-hop group Heavy D & the Boyz, begins and each repertory cast member is introduced alphabetically, followed by the featured cast. When all cast members and guests are introduced, the music stops and the title sequence ends with the phrase "You are now watching Mad TV."

Cast

Repertory cast members
 Ike Barinholtz  (23/23 episodes) 
 Frank Caliendo  (13/23 episodes) 
 Daniele Gaither  (22/23 episodes) 
 Keegan-Michael Key  (22/23 episodes) 
 Bobby Lee  (21/23 episodes) 
 Michael McDonald  (22/23 episodes) 
 Nicole Parker  (23/23 episodes) 
 Ron Pederson  (22/23 episodes) 
 Jordan Peele  (15/23 episodes) 
 Aries Spears  (18/23 episodes) 
 Paul Vogt  (22/23 episodes) 
 Stephnie Weir  (23/23 episodes) 

Featured cast members
 Crista Flanagan  (5/23 episodes) 
 Spencer Kayden  (4/23 episodes)

Episodes

Home releases 
Season 10 of Mad TV has not been released on DVD. However, several sketches culled from this season appear on a compilation DVD called Mad TV: The Best of Seasons 8, 9, and 10 (first released on October 25, 2005).

As of 2020, season 10 is available on HBO Max, with episodes 3, 5, 6, 8, 9, 10, 11, 12, 14, 15, and 21 missing.

External links 
 TV.com/ Mad TV - Official Website
 

10
2004 American television seasons
2005 American television seasons